The Geological Survey of India (GSI) currently maintains two protected areas bearing rich fossil deposits.

 Shivalik Fossil Park, near Saketi, Himachal Pradesh is notable for its life-size models of the vertebrates that might have roamed the Sivalik Hills 1.5—2.5 million years ago.
 Mandla Plant Fossils National Park, near Dindori, Madhya Pradesh is a park that attempts to preserve the fossil remains of a primordial forest that covered the region 40—150 million years ago.

Both parks, numerous fossil displays and models in Indian zoological parks, are part of the Geological Survey's charter program to educate the general public on the Earth's evolutionary history. One of the more comprehensive displays is that of the Natural History Museum of the Nehru Zoological Park, Hyderabad.

The GSI also manages the following fossil parks:

 National Fossil Wood Park, Tiruvakkarai in Tamil Nadu.
 National Fossil Wood Park, Sathanur, in Tamil Nadu

Other fossil parks in India include:

 Indroda Dinosaur and Fossil Park, Gujarat
 Ghughua Fossil Park, Madhya Pradesh
 Salkhan Fossils Park, Uttar Pradesh
 Akal Wood Fossil Park, Rajasthan 
 Amkhoi Fossil Park, West Bengal
 Raiyoli Dinosaur Fossil Park, Gujarat
Rajmahal Hills Fossil Park, Bihar
 Wadadham Fossils Park, Wadadam, Sironcha, Gadchiroli, Maharashtra

See also
 List of fossil sites (with link directory)
 Archaeological sites in India
 Tourism in India

References

 
Paleontological sites of Asia
Lists of protected areas of India
Paleontology in India